Vanity Fair was a British weekly magazine that was published from 1868 to 1914. Founded by Thomas Gibson Bowles in London, the magazine included articles on fashion, theatre, current events as well as word games and serial fiction. The cream of the period’s "society magazines", it is best known for its witty prose and caricatures of famous people of Victorian and Edwardian society, including artists, athletes, royalty, statesmen, scientists, authors, actors, business people and scholars.

Taking its title from Thackeray's popular satire on early 19th-century British society, Vanity Fair was not immediately successful and struggled with competition from rival publications. Bowles then promised his readers 'Some Pictorial Wares of an entirely novel character', and on 30 January 1869, a full-page caricature of Benjamin Disraeli appeared. This was the first of over 2,300 caricatures to be published. According to the National Portrait Gallery in London, "Vanity Fairs illustrations, instantly recognizable in terms of style and size, led to a rapid increase in demand for the magazine. It gradually became a mark of honour to be the 'victim' of one of its numerous caricaturists. Bowles’s witty accompanying texts, full of insights and innuendoes, certainly contributed towards the popularity of these images".

History

Subtitled "A Weekly Show of Political, Social and Literary Wares", it was founded in 1868 by Thomas Gibson Bowles, who aimed to expose the contemporary vanities of Victorian society. Colonel Fred Burnaby provided £100 of the original £200 capital, and inspired by Thackeray's popular satire on early 19th-century British society suggested the title Vanity Fair'''. The first issue appeared in London on 7 November 1868. It offered its readers articles on fashion, current events, the theatre, books, social events and the latest scandals, together with serial fiction, word games and other trivia.

Bowles wrote much of the magazine himself under various pseudonyms, such as "Jehu Junior", but contributors included Lewis Carroll, Arthur Hervey, Willie Wilde, Jessie Pope, P. G. Wodehouse (who also wrote for the unrelated Condé Nast magazine of the same name) and Bertram Fletcher Robinson (who was editor from June 1904 to October 1906). Lewis Carroll created a series of word ladder puzzles, which he then called "Doublets", which first appeared in the 29 March 1879 issue.

Thomas Allinson bought the magazine in 1911 from Frank Harris, by which time it was failing financially. He failed to revive it and the final issue of Vanity Fair appeared on 5 February 1914, after which it was merged into Hearth and Home.

Caricatures

A full-page, colour lithograph of a contemporary celebrity or dignitary appeared in most issues, and it is for these caricatures that Vanity Fair'' is best known then and today. Subjects included artists, athletes, royalty, statesmen, scientists, authors, actors, soldiers, religious personalities, business people and scholars. More than two thousand of these images appeared, and they are considered the chief cultural legacy of the magazine, forming a pictorial record of the period. They were produced by an international group of artists, including Sir Max Beerbohm, Sir Leslie Ward (who signed his work "Spy" and "Drawl"), the Italians Carlo Pellegrini ("Singe" and "Ape"), Melchiorre Delfico ("Delfico"), Liborio Prosperi ("Lib"), the Florentine artist and critic Adriano Cecioni, the French artists James Tissot ("Coïdé"), Prosper d'Épinay ("Nemo") and the American Thomas Nast.

Image gallery

See also
List of Vanity Fair artists
List of Vanity Fair caricatures
The Rowers of Vanity Fair Wikibook gives a history of the magazine with focus on sportsmen

References

External links

 .

 
Weekly magazines published in the United Kingdom
Defunct magazines published in the United Kingdom
Magazines published in England
Magazine publishing companies of England
Magazines published in London
Publishing companies based in London
1868 establishments in the United Kingdom
1914 disestablishments in the United Kingdom
Magazines established in 1868
Magazines disestablished in 1914